Thunderbirds Are Go is a 1966 British science-fiction puppet film based on Thunderbirds, a Supermarionation television series created by Gerry and Sylvia Anderson and produced by their company Century 21 Productions. Written by the Andersons and directed by David Lane, Thunderbirds Are Go concerns spacecraft Zero-X and its human mission to Mars. When Zero-X suffers a malfunction during re-entry, it is up to life-saving organisation International Rescue, supported by its technologically-advanced Thunderbird machines, to activate the trapped crew's escape pod before the spacecraft hits the ground.

Filmed between March and June 1966 at Century 21's studios on the Slough Trading Estate and on location in Portugal, Thunderbirds Are Go features guest appearances by puppet versions of Cliff Richard and The Shadows, who also contributed to the film's score. It was the first film to be shot using an early form of video assist called "Add-a-Vision". The film's special effects sequences, directed by Derek Meddings, took six months to complete.

Although early reviews praised the film as a successful cinematic transfer of the TV series, Thunderbirds Are Go drew a lukewarm public response and proved to be a box office failure. Later reviews would criticise the film for its minimal characterisation, lengthy effects shots, and inclusion of a fantasy dream sequence centring on Richard and The Shadows. Surprised by the film's underperformance, and confident that Thunderbirds still had cinematic potential, distributors United Artists ordered a sequel, Thunderbird 6. However, this too received a mediocre critical and commercial response and caused the franchise to be abandoned until the early 2000s. Zero-X later appeared in the first episode of Captain Scarlet and the Mysterons, the Andersons' follow-up to Thunderbirds, while tie-in publication TV Century 21 ran a Zero-X comic strip until 1969.

Plot
In 2065, the first human mission to Mars is launched from Glenn Field in the form of the spacecraft Zero-X. Unknown to Captain Travers and his four-man crew, master criminal the Hood has stowed away on board to photograph Zero-Xs wing mechanism. Shortly after lift-off, the Hood inadvertently traps his foot in the craft's hydraulics, jamming them and causing Zero-X to go out of control. As the astronauts eject in the escape pod, the Hood extracts his crushed foot and parachutes to safety from the undercarriage. Zero-X crashes into the ocean and explodes.

In 2067, the Inquiry Board of the Space Exploration Center concludes that Zero-X was sabotaged. Meanwhile, a second Zero-X has been built and another mission to Mars planned. International Rescue agrees to provide security at the launch given the possibility of further sabotage. Jeff Tracy dispatches Scott to Glenn Field in Thunderbird 1 to monitor the situation from the ground, while Virgil and Alan are assigned to escort Zero-X through the atmosphere in Thunderbirds 2 and 3. Posing as a reporter at the pre-launch press conference, Lady Penelope arranges for each member of the crew to wear a St Christopher brooch with a concealed homing device. On launch day, Dr Grant's device is no longer registering, even though Grant is on board Zero-X awaiting lift-off. Scott unmasks "Grant" as the Hood in disguise. The Hood flees Glenn Field in a car, pursued by Penelope and Parker in FAB 1. Reaching the coast, he transfers to a speedboat and then a helicopter. Parker shoots down the helicopter with FAB 1's machine gun. Meanwhile, the kidnapped Grant is found and returned to Zero-X and the spacecraft is launched without further incident.

Mission complete, Penelope invites Scott and Virgil to join her at popular nightclub The Swinging Star. Returning to Tracy Island, Alan feels unappreciated when Jeff insists that he stay at base while the others spend the night partying. Asleep in bed, Alan has a surreal dream in which he and Penelope travel to another Swinging Star located in space. Appearing at the nightclub are Cliff Richard Jr and The Shadows, who perform a song called "Shooting Star" and an instrumental called "Lady Penelope". The dream ends when Alan falls out of The Swinging Star and back to Earth, waking to discover that he has merely fallen out of bed.

After a six-week flight, Zero-X reaches Mars on 22 July and all of the astronauts except Space Navigator Newman touch down on the planet in their lander, the Martian Excursion Vehicle (MEV). Investigating the surface, the men are puzzled to find strange, coil-like rock formations. Space Captain Martin destroys one of the structures with the MEV's gun and Dr Pierce prepares to go outside to collect samples. The other structures come to life, revealing themselves to be one-eyed rock snakes. The aliens bombard the MEV with fireballs from their mouths, forcing the astronauts to take off prematurely. Docking with Newman in orbit, they start back to Earth.

As Zero-X re-enters Earth's atmosphere on 2 September, lifting body no 2 fails to connect with the spacecraft due to a radio control fault, and damages various systems, including flight control and the escape pod circuit. With the astronauts unable to eject and Zero-X set to impact on Craigsville, Florida (pop 4,800),  Jeff launches Scott and Brains in Thunderbird 1 and Virgil, Alan and Gordon in Thunderbird 2. Craigsville is evacuated. Lifted into Zero-Xs undercarriage, Alan repairs the escape circuit under Brains' guidance. Seconds before impact, Alan completes his task and jumps out as the astronauts eject. The empty Zero-X crashes into Craigsville. Picked up by Penelope and Parker in FAB1, Alan is driven to the real Swinging Star where Penelope, joined by the Tracy family, Brains and Tin-Tin, toast Alan as a hero.

Production

When filming on Series One of Thunderbirds ended in late 1965, Gerry Anderson and his financial backer, Lew Grade, agreed that a feature film would be the next logical step in expanding the Thunderbirds franchise. With United Artists contracted to distribute, a budget of £250,000 (about £ million in ) was set and Anderson and his wife, Sylvia, began work on the script at their second home in Portugal.

The couple decided to base the film on the American-Soviet "Space Race" – in particular the race to land astronauts on the Moon – but adapt this premise for the futuristic world of Thunderbirds by switching the location to Mars. During the pre-production of their next puppet series, Captain Scarlet and the Mysterons, they would write in a second appearance of the Zero-X as a link to Thunderbirds. Like Thunderbirds Are Go, Captain Scarlet depicts hostile life on Mars, though the Mysterons of the TV series pose a greater threat than the "Rock Snakes" of the film in that they strike at Earth itself. The rescue of Zero-X is similar to that of Fireflash in the Thunderbirds episode "Operation Crash-Dive".

Frustrated with the limitations of the puppets and concerned that the TV series would not transfer well to the big screen, Alan Pattillo declined to direct the film. The role was instead given to 24-year-old David Lane, who had directed several of the TV episodes. This made Lane the UK's youngest film director at the time.

The dream sequence set at The Swinging Star was spearheaded by Sylvia, who expanded it by scripting a musical interlude performed by puppet versions of Cliff Richard and The Shadows. Richard and Shadows band member Bruce Welch both owned homes in Portugal near the Andersons, and it was there that the two agreed to "appear" in the film as Supermarionation puppets. Having also agreed to contribute to the film's score, Richard and The Shadows recorded a song titled "Shooting Star" and an instrumental titled "Lady Penelope". Sylvia acknowledged that the dream sequence does not advance the plot, noting in her autobiography that it was "sheer indulgence that would not have been possible on our television budget." Stephen La Rivière, author of Supermarionation: A History of the Future, regards the sequence as the strangest ever created for an Anderson production.

Voice cast

The Tracys, the other inhabitants of Tracy Island, Lady Penelope, Parker and the Hood are voiced, with one exception, by the actors who voiced them in Series One of Thunderbirds. Voice actors introduced in Thunderbirds Are Go are:

Jeremy Wilkin as Virgil Tracy. David Holliday, the original voice of Virgil, had returned to the United States following the completion of Thunderbirds Series One. For the films and Series Two, the character was voiced by Wilkin. Wilkin would continue his association with the Andersons for several years, going on to voice supporting characters in Captain Scarlet, Joe 90 and The Secret Service and appear in the live-action productions Doppelgänger, UFO and The Protectors.
Paul Maxwell as Captain Paul Travers. Having previously voiced Steve Zodiac in Fireball XL5, Maxwell also provided uncredited guest character voices in Thunderbirds Series Two, and portrayed Captain Grey in Captain Scarlet.
Alexander Davion as Space Captain Greg Martin. Davion later appeared in an episode of UFO.
Bob Monkhouse as Space Navigator Brad Newman. Monkhouse would host the game show The Golden Shot from 1967 to 1972. The role of Newman was first given to Alfred Marks, who then withdrew due to a fee dispute. Monkhouse originally approached Gerry Anderson to ask his permission to film a comedy sketch parodying Stingray but ended up agreeing to replace Marks. Monkhouse recalled the conversation: "[Anderson] said, 'How much would you charge for the job?' I said, 'Gerry, I'd do it for nothing.' And that was the first time I ever heard the phrase, 'the price is right'." He adopted an American accent for the film.
Neil McCallum as Dr Ray Pierce. McCallum's later credits include appearances in Captain Scarlet, UFO and The Protectors.
Charles Tingwell as Dr Tony Grant. Known for his role as Alan Dawson in the medical drama Emergency – Ward 10, Tingwell was approached by the Andersons on the recommendation of Ray Barrett. Like Paul Maxwell, he provided uncredited guest character voices in Thunderbirds Series Two, as well as providing voices in Captain Scarlet and making a guest appearance in UFO.
Cliff Richard as Cliff Richard Jr. Cast in Portugal, where he owned a house "next-door-but-one" to the Andersons, Richard was "thrilled" to be involved in the film. He has fond memories of his Supermarionation puppet: "It was quite a hoot ... I was never really sure if I looked like my puppet or it looked like me."
The Shadows (Brian Bennett, Hank Marvin, John Rostill and Bruce Welch) as themselves, backing Richard Jr in the Swinging Star dream sequence.

Filming

Pre-production lasted three months and a 16-week shooting schedule was drawn up to coincide with the filming of Thunderbirds Series Two. Principal photography began on 3 March 1966 and ended in late June. The staff at AP Films were divided into "A" and "B" units: A to shoot the film and B the TV episodes. To accommodate its increased workload, APF bought two additional buildings near its site on the Slough Trading Estate, combining these with the pre-existing puppet workshop, art department building and publicity centre to form a production base of five buildings. Converted by January 1966, one of these former factory units contained puppet stages while the other incorporated a single large sound stage on which all of the film's model and effects work would be completed.

Thunderbirds Are Go was filmed in Techniscope with a 2.35:1 widescreen aspect ratio. The possibility of using anamorphic lenses was rejected as depth of field problems made them unsuitable for effects shots. Techniscope, on the other hand, used spherical lenses but still produced a cinematic "letterbox" image. All APF productions up to this point had been filmed on Arriflex cameras, but for the film these were replaced with Mitchells.

The film was the first to be shot using a video assist technology called the Livingston Electronic Viewfinder Unit. Also known as "Add-a-Vision", this system comprised a viewfinder that relayed images from the shooting camera to video monitors elsewhere in the studio. This allowed the crew to examine newly filmed footage live on set and in better quality than before. Add-a-Vision also helped the puppet operators, who were stationed on gantries several feet above the studio floor and could not easily monitor the puppets' movements. In addition, the system incorporated a playback function for viewing rushes. Based on German video assist technology, Add-A-Vision was developed by Thunderbirds director of photography John Read in collaboration with Prowest Electronics.

To improve the look of the puppets, director David Lane often kept tops of heads and control wires out of shot and incorporated low-angle shots for dramatic effect. The background shots for Alan's rescue of the Zero-X crew were originally filmed on location in Portugal but were judged unsatisfactory and replaced with a painted backdrop created by associate producer Reg Hill. The location shoot also included filming a point-of-view "spiral shot" for the end of Alan's dream in which the character plunges back to Earth. However, this shot was also deemed inadequate and replaced with footage of a model version built at APF Studios in Slough.

Puppets

Promising Television Mail that Thunderbirds Are Go would be "bigger and better than anything we have ever done before", Gerry Anderson realised that any design flaws that showed up on the big screen would not be forgiven as quickly as those on TV. The puppets were therefore expertly revamped, with new paint, wigs and costumes. Models and sets were re-built from scratch with greater attention to detail. Over the course of the production, APF's puppet wardrobe was expanded to include more than 700 costumes, with 150 extra costumes made as spares.

Some of the established characters, including Scott Tracy, were re-sculpted from the original puppets, while guest characters, such as the Zero-X crew, were entirely new creations. The guest character puppets of the TV series had had faces made of Plasticine that had been re-modelled for each appearance. This approach was largely abandoned for the film: as some of the puppets would be representing real-life celebrities, a decision was made to build most of the supporting characters in fibreglass to the same standards of workmanship as the main puppets. As with Scott Tracy, the puppet playing Captain Travers was modelled on Sean Connery.

The film puppets had the same body proportions as their TV predecessors. As filming progressed, APF developed a new prototype puppet with an animatronic mouth to produce more realistic lip and jaw movement. However, the results proved unsatisfactory and the idea was abandoned. For its next TV series, Captain Scarlet and the Mysterons, APF would introduce a brand-new puppet design that used natural proportions, made possible by moving the internal lip-sync mechanism from the head to the chest. The puppets of the sequel film Thunderbird 6 were designed as a compromise between the two generations, with increased realism and less overt caricature.

Set design

The art department directors, Bob Bell and Keith Wilson, divided their efforts: Wilson worked on Series Two while Bell concentrated on the film. Sets that Bell made for the film included the Glenn Field Control Tower and news conference room, the Swinging Star interiors, and re-designed versions of various locations on Tracy Island.

The set design for the Space Exploration Center conference room was heavily influenced by producer Sylvia Anderson, who insisted on a tangerine and black colour scheme in vivid contrast with the blue of the SEC officials' uniforms. Filming of the conference room scene involved the simultaneous operation of 20 puppets, a feat that APF could not have achieved on a TV budget.

Lane commented: "Thunderbirds Are Go was done like an episode but on a bigger scale. Whereas we would think that it might be nice to do a particular shot on the series but couldn't afford to, with Thunderbirds Are Go we just did it because we had the money." In the Swinging Star scenes, background characters are represented by enlarged black-and-white photographs. Anderson compared these scenes to a "Busby Berkeley sequence" due to their surrealism, aspects of which include a giant guitar and pink "space clouds" composed of dry ice. She stated that the appearance of real-life celebrities in puppet form helped the film's promotion.

Special effects

Derek Meddings and his team of 28 technicians filmed the special effects shots in six months. The main effects pieces were the Zero-X launch sequences, new  Thunderbird launch sequences, the car chase involving FAB 1 and the Hood, the Swinging Star scenes, the sequences set on the Martian surface, and the destruction of Zero-X. Over 300 of the film's effects used scale models. The crew took advantage of the considerable space inside the new effects building to experiment with low-angle shots and other, more inventive camera angles. Building new models of the Thunderbird machines was especially problematic in the case of Thunderbird 2, as Meddings explained: "Unfortunately, its replacement was not only the wrong colour, it was a completely different shape. Although we had several more built in different scales, I never felt our model makers managed to re-capture the look of the original."

Although the model took months to build, all of its scenes, from launch to destruction, were completed in two days. The cockpit was based on that of Concorde, a prototype of which was under construction at Filton Airfield in Bristol. A long shot of the Zero-X lifting body exploding in Earth's atmosphere was the only effects work that was filmed outdoors; the shot was mounted on a gantry at a nearby power station against the actual sky, with Cordtex explosive strips, gunpowder, naphtha, magnesium and petroleum gel used to create a "fireball" effect.

The film's effects later became so well known in the industry that the crew of James Cameron's film Aliens (1986) used them for reference.

Editing

Post-production was completed in the autumn to allow the film to be released in time for Christmas. The film was edited by Len Walter, who had previously worked on the TV series.

The workprint exceeded United Artists' maximum permitted running time by roughly 15 minutes, forcing Walter to cut a number of scenes that were inessential to the plot. Some of the deleted scenes concerned the SEC's attempts to persuade International Rescue to escort Zero-X. At the same time, the Hood telepathically contacts his half-brother Kyrano (voiced by David Graham), Jeff's retainer on Tracy Island, and forces him to disclose the Tracy family's intentions. With the removal of the latter scene, Kyrano was completely cut from the film. Other scenes saw Lady Penelope and Parker flying to Glenn Field aboard the hypersonic airliner Fireflash and Jeff Tracy making a speech to the world through the Trans American TV Network.

The deleted scenes are now considered lost, with only still photographs and brief footage surviving. One of the photographs, showing Brains and Alan standing behind a TV camera as Jeff prepares to make his speech, appeared as the cover of issue 35 of FAB magazine. Another shows the Hood standing in his jungle temple with a clapperboard in front of him. Footage from the Trans American TV Network sequence was later edited into the Joe 90 episode "International Concerto".

Post-production
With Walter's editing complete, composer Barry Gray recorded the score in six sessions between 9 and 11 October at Anvil Studios near Denham, Buckinghamshire. The music was performed by a 70-piece orchestra supplemented by Gray's own electronic effects. The closing credits are accompanied by footage of the Royal Marines Band Service performing the "Thunderbirds March"; this was filmed in a single morning at the Royal Marines School of Music in Deal, Kent, with the marines conducted by Lieutenant Colonel Vivian Dunn. Three weeks were allotted for visual wrap-up work, minor animation, sound editing, dubbing and the creation of the opening titles. The film was submitted to the British Board of Film Censors in November and given a U certificate.

The film's animated opening titles present the main puppet cast and are accompanied by the re-recorded version of the "Thunderbirds March".  The closing credits include a number of self-referential acknowledgements to individuals and companies alleged to have contributed to the production, such as SEC chairman Space Colonel Harris, Glenn Field's Commander Casey and the Century 21 "Space Location Unit". The credits end with the humorous disclaimer: "None of the characters appearing in this photoplay intentionally resemble any persons living or dead ... since they do not yet exist!"

Release and reception
 

By December 1966, Lew Grade's attempts to sell Thunderbirds to American TV networks had failed. He instructed Gerry Anderson to cancel the production of Thunderbirds Series Two after only six episodes and begin preparations for a new series. Around this time, APF was rebranded "Century 21 Productions"; this name was first carried by Thunderbirds Are Go to link the film to APF's tie-in comic TV Century 21. The film was the first Anderson project to be promoted, in full, as a "Gerry Anderson Century 21 Production".

After a well-received test screening for United Artists executives, Thunderbirds Are Go premiered at the London Pavilion cinema on 12 December. The premiere was held in aid of children's charity Barnardo's with the Royal Marines Band Service performing the "Thunderbirds March" both before and after the screening.

Critical response

The film's December 1966 release came amid what commentators dubbed the "Thunderbirds Christmas" – a rush among retailers to sell Thunderbirds toys, games, books and other tie-ins. An early review of the film in Kine Weekly described it as a "colourful extension" of the TV series, while the News of the World praised it for providing "breathtaking entertainment". The Sunday Express was also positive, calling the concept of a Mars mission "awesome" and commending the film's visuals: "Of course, the cast are all puppets, the sets, models, and the story unabashed nonsense. But it's great all the same." Elsewhere, the Daily Mail praised the puppets' big-screen transition: "So who needs people? These handsome, stiff-necked, shiny-faced Thunderbirds puppets have broken spectacularly out of black-and-white TV and on to the cinema screen."

The Andersons began a tour of the country to promote the film. Around this time, it became apparent that public interest was lukewarm and the box office revenue mediocre. According to Gerry Anderson: "When we got off the plane at the first destination we were told that the film was in trouble. Cinemas were apparently half-full. When we got to the next big city we got more news that made us even more depressed – box office figures were inexplicably low wherever we went." He believed that Thunderbirds origins as a TV series weakened the film's chances of success: "The only thing we could think was that at that time the audience was not used to seeing a feature film version of a television show. So people would see Thunderbirds and think, 'We've seen it on television.'" Sylvia Anderson had a similar explanation: "Although we still had our loyal television fans, they remained just that – firmly seated in front of their television screens and not in the cinema."

Supermarionation historian Stephen La Rivière suggests that the film was also facing strong competition from an influx of family films including Batman and Born Free, as well as re-issues of The Wizard Of Oz (1939), Mary Poppins (1964) and  The Sound of Music (1965). Later reviews were less positive: while the Slough Observer described the film as "basically a Technicolor large-screen extension" of the TV series, The Times was critical, arguing that the TV-style storytelling and characterisation were too thin to sustain a feature film and that the frequent launch sequences were more for padding than visual appeal.

Writer John Peel comments that Thunderbirds Are Go is "well-made" and fulfils its promise to deliver visual spectacle. He considers it superior to its sequel, Thunderbird 6, but suggests that the plot is partly recycled from the TV episodes and describes the dream sequence as "painfully silly". Both La Rivière and Peel believe that the Thunderbird machines are underused. La Rivière also suggests that the lengthy model shots and reduced role of the Tracy family may have disappointed the film's young target audience.

Jeff Stafford of Turner Classic Movies regards the film in its entirety as a "pop culture novelty as fascinating and endearing as a toy from one's childhood." He agrees that the effects sequences are protracted: "You'll feel yourself growing older as cranes and hydraulic lifts slowly – very slowly – prepare for a missile launch." William Gallagher of BBC Online gives a positive review, calling Thunderbirds Are Go "every bit as good" as the TV series. However, he also suggests that Thunderbirds worked better on the small screen, writing of the film's content: "Certainly there's no greater profundity or universal theme to the film, it is just an extended episode." He rates Thunderbirds Are Go three stars out of five, as does the Film4 website.

Sequel

Dismissing the film's critical and commercial failure as a stroke of bad luck, United Artists told Anderson to make a sequel: Thunderbird 6. According to Anderson: "None of us ... could understand why the film hadn't succeeded, so it was decided we would make another one." The Andersons deliberately wrote Thunderbird 6 as a more light-hearted adventure. However, the response to the second film was similarly lukewarm, spelling the end of Thunderbirds as a media franchise until the release of the live-action film Thunderbirds nearly four decades later in 2004.

Other media

Books and comics
A novelisation by Angus P. Allan was released by Armada Books in 1966. In addition, TV Century 21 published a four-part "photographic picturisation" of the film narrating it from the perspective of the Zero-X crew. After this, the publication printed Zero-X comic strips until 1969; these told the continuing adventures of the astronauts, once again led by Captain Travers, as they explored the rest of the Solar System and beyond aboard the Zero-X "Mark III".

A connection to Captain Scarlet was established in issues published between June and September 1967. In these issues, a follow-up expedition to Mars, led by Captain Black of the world security organisation Spectrum, ends in disaster when Black (as shown in the first episode of Captain Scarlet) falls under the control of the malevolent Mysterons. Zero-X returns to Earth and lands at Glenn Field, where the possessed Black avoids capture by the authorities.

Soundtrack and home video
A re-recorded version of the score was released as a vinyl record by United Artists in 1967 and Silva Screen Records in 1987. It was subsequently released on CD in 1990 with a re-release by EMI two years later. In 2014, the original soundtrack recordings for Thunderbirds are Go and Thunderbird 6 were released by La-La Land Records as a limited-edition CD.

Thunderbirds Are Go was first released on DVD in 2001, in Regions 2 and 4, by MGM. In 2004, an "International Rescue Edition" was released; this was also available in Region 1 and was marketed both separately and as a box set with Thunderbird 6. In 2014, Twilight Time (through its sub-licensing deal with MGM) released both films as a double feature Blu-ray set, limited to 3,000 copies and available only from the Screen Archives Entertainment website. This set was re-released by Kino Lorber in 2017.

See also

List of puppet films
List of films set in the future
List of films set on Mars
List of films featuring space stations
List of films featuring extraterrestrials

Notes

References

Works cited

External links

1960s disaster films
1960s science fiction adventure films
1966 films
1966 directorial debut films
British space adventure films
Films about astronauts
Films about extraterrestrial life
Are Go, Thunderbirds
Films set in 2065
Films set in 2067
Films set in Florida
Films set in Kent
Films shot in Berkshire
Films shot in Buckinghamshire
Films shot in Kent
Films shot in Portugal
Marionette films
Mars in film
United Artists films
1960s English-language films
1960s British films